USS Luce may refer to various United States Navy ships named for Stephen B. Luce:

 , a Wickes-class destroyer launched in 1918 and scrapped in 1936
 , a Fletcher-class destroyer launched in 1943 and sunk during the Battle of Okinawa, 1945
 , a Farragut-class guided missile destroyer launched in 1958 and scrapped in 2004

See also
 , a patrol vessel in commission from 1917 to 1919

United States Navy ship names